Stenopterapion meliloti is a species of pear-shaped weevil in the family of beetles known as Brentidae.

References

Further reading

External links

 

Brentidae
Beetles described in 1808